Acmaeops is a genus of beetles in the family Cerambycidae, containing the following species:

 Acmaeops discoideus (Haldeman, 1847)
 Acmaeops proteus (Kirby in Richardson, 1837)
 Acmaeops brachyptera
 Acmaeops discoidea
 Acmaeops marginata
 Acmaeops pratensis
 Acmaeops septentrionis
 Acmaeops smaragdula

References

Lepturinae